The Southern Nigeria Regiment was a British Colonial Auxiliary Forces regiment which operated in Nigeria in the early part of the 20th century.

The Regiment was formed out of the Niger Coast Protectorate Force and part of the Royal Niger Constabulary.  The Lagos Battalion or Hausa Force was absorbed into the Regiment in May 1906 and became the Regiment's second battalion.

On 1 January 1914 the Southern Nigeria Regiment's two battalions were merged with those of the Northern Nigeria Regiment to become simply the Nigeria Regiment.

The regiment contributed most of the British troops during the Aro-Anglo war November 1901 to March 1902.

Commanding officers
The following had command of the Regiment:
21 September 1896 Captain C H P Carter, Royal Scots (Brevet Major from 1 January 1900)
12 February 1901 Brevet Lieutenant-Colonel Arthur Forbes Montanaro, Royal Artillery
Summer 1904 to summer 1905, Major H M Trenchard (acting)
3 August 1905 Brevet Major H C Moorhouse, Royal Artillery
Spring 1907 to 1910, Lieutenant Colonel H M Trenchard, Royal Scots Fusiliers
25 September 1911 Major F H Cunliffe Middlesex Regiment

See also
Hugh Trenchard in Nigeria

Notes

British colonial regiments
Regiments of Nigeria
History of Nigeria
Military units and formations disestablished in 1914
Colonial Nigeria